The Cadets is a 2004 Russian TV series about a class of Soviet artillery officer cadets going through training prior to their commissioning and entry into the Battle of Stalingrad during World War II (The Great Patriotic War). The ten parts series are based on the memoirs of Pyotr Todorovsky and directed by Andrei Kavun.

The US DVD release of the series was done as two volumes with two discs in each volume.

References

External links

Russia-1 original programming
Television series set in the 1940s
Russian television miniseries
Films directed by Andrey Kavun
2004 Russian television series debuts
2004 Russian television series endings
2000s Russian television series
Russian World War II films